WDR Fernsehen is a German free-to-air television network owned and operated by Westdeutscher Rundfunk and serving North Rhine-Westphalia. It is one of the seven regional "third programmes" television stations that are offered within the federal ARD network.

History
The station began broadcasting on 17 December 1965, as Westdeutsches Fernsehen (WDF), changing its name to West 3 in 1988, before settling for WDR Fernsehen in 1994.

Originally airing only in North Rhine-Westphalia, the channel has become available across Germany with the advent of Cable TV and satellite television. The station is also available free-to-air across Europe via Astra 19.2°E.

In November 2013, the channel faced a graphical rebrand.

News sub-regions
WDR Fernsehen operates eleven sub-regional opt-out services, each broadcasting a 30-minute local news programme entitled Lokalzeit at 19.30 each Monday to Saturday evening together with a shorter, 5-minute bulletin at 18.00 on Mondays to Fridays:
Aachen: Lokalzeit aus Aachen 
Wuppertal: Lokalzeit Bergisches Land
Bonn: Lokalzeit aus Bonn
Dortmund: Lokalzeit aus Dortmund
Duisburg: Lokalzeit aus Duisburg
Düsseldorf: Lokalzeit aus Düsseldorf
Cologne: Lokalzeit aus Köln
Münster: Lokalzeit Münsterland
Bielefeld: Lokalzeit OWL aktuell
Essen: Lokalzeit Ruhr
Siegen: Lokalzeit Südwestfalen

Programmes

Children

Die Sendung mit dem Elefanten (2007–present)
Die Sendung mit der Maus (1971–present)

Entertainment 

Die Wiwaldi-Show (2012–2016)
Zimmer frei (1996–2016)

Information 

Aktuelle Stunde (1983–present)
 (1997–present)
Lokalzeit (1996–present)
Westpol (1992–present)

Series 

Eyewitness (Øyevitne) (2017)
In aller Freundschaft (2003–present)
Lindenstraße (1997–present)
Phoenixsee (2016–present)
Prey (Prey - Die Beute) (2015–2016)
Rote Rosen (2007–2009)
Sturm der Liebe (2005–2009)
Schimanski (1998–2016)
Tatort (2006–present)
The Game (2015)

Sport 

Sport Inside (2007–present)
Zeiglers wunderbare Welt des Fußballs, hosted by Arnd Zeigler (2007–present)

Talk

B. trifft..., hosted by Bettina Böttinger (1993–2004)
Domian, hosted by Jürgen Domian (1995–2016)
Domian live, hosted by Jürgen Domian (2019–present)Kölner Treff'', hosted by Bettina Böttinger (2006–present)

Logos

References

External links

 

Westdeutscher Rundfunk
Television stations in Germany
Television channels and stations established in 1965
German-language television stations